Ralph Wendell Conant (1926-2017) was a writer and researcher in the areas of social policy, metropolitan governance, and regional planning. Conant is also the former president of Shimer College and Unity College.

Biography
He holds a PhD and a MA degree from the University of Chicago, where he studied public administration, urban politics and political philosophy.
 
His most recent publications are:  Toward a More Perfect Union:  The Governance of Metropolitan America, with Daniel J. Myers, 1st edition, 2002; 2nd edition, 2006 and forthcoming, City of Destiny:  Denver in the Making, with Maxine Kurtz, to be published by Chandler & Sharp in 2007.
 
He served as faculty at several institutions and as a staff member at advocacy groups and research groups.

From 1975 to 1978, he was president of Shimer College. From 1978-1980, he was president of Unity College in Maine.  He lived in Trinidad, California.

Professional, academic, and civic experience

He has served on the faculty of  Michigan State University (1956-1957); staff, National Municipal (Civic) League (1957-1959); Lecturer, Graduate School of Public Administration, New York University, 1958-1959;  Executive Director, Citizens for Michigan (1959-1960); faculty, University of Denver (1960-1961); as Assistant Director, Joint Center for Urban Studies, MIT-Harvard (1961-1967); Lecturer, Graduate School of Social Work, Boston College, 1965-1967; Director of Research, New England Economic Research Foundation, 1968-1969; Associate Director, Lemberg Center for the Study of Violence, Brandeis University (1967-1969). Lecturer, Southern Police Institute, Louisville, KY (annually), 1970-1974.

He was founding President, Southwest Center for Urban Research, Houston and Professor of Urban Design, Rice University School of Architecture, Professor of Political Science, University of Houston, Texas Southern University, Baylor College of Medicine, and University of Texas School of Public Health (1969-1975).

President, Shimer College (1975-1978); and President, Unity College in Maine (1978-1980).  He was a citizen member of the New England Regional Commission on Comprehensive Health Planning. Since 1980, he has served as a member of the Maine State Board of Education (1984–89), as special assistant to the president at Mercy College (1987–89), a Senior Fellow at the Phelps-Stokes Fund in Washington, DC. Executive Director, Maine Common Cause. He ran twice for the US Congress in Maine’s First Congressional District, 1984 and 1986 and in 1990 for the State Senate in his home district.

He was president of the Asgard Foundation; an author, and president of Conant Associates. He is married to Sheila M. Conant and lives in Trinidad, California. He has a farm in Maine dating to the family settlement in 1771.

Publications
Ralph Conant is author of books, monographs, and articles (listed below) on social policy, metropolitan governance, regional planning, and conflict resolution.  He holds PhD and MA degrees from the University of Chicago and a BA degree from the University of Vermont.

His recent publications are:

Toward a More Perfect Union:  The Governance of Metropolitan America, with Daniel J. Myers, 1st edition, 2002; 2nd edition, 2006, Chandler & Sharp. Foreword to Invisible Cage, A Memoir, Maxine Kurtz, Chandler & Sharp, 2006. City of Destiny: Denver in the Making, with Maxine Kurtz, Chandler & Sharp in 2008.
 
Forthcoming books are: The Future of Poverty in American Cities, with Daniel J. Myers; Revolution and the Search for World Peace, with Guillermo Owen, to be published by Chandler & Sharp in 2009.

His previous books include:  The Public Library and the City, MIT, 1965; The State’s Biggest Business: Local and Regional Problems, Policy Papers for the Connecticut Commission to Study the Necessity and Feasibility of Metropolitan Government, 1967; The Politics of Community Health, Public Affairs Press, 1968; Problems of Research in Community Violence, with Molly Apple Levin, Praeger, 1969; The Prospects for Revolution, Harper & Row, 1971; The Metropolitan Library, MIT, 1972; Urban Perspectives: Politics and Policies, with Alan Shank, Holbrook Press, 1975; The Conant Report:  A Study of the Education of Librarians, MIT, 1980; Private Means Public Ends:  Private Business in Social Service Delivery, with Barry J. Carroll and Thomas A. Easton, Praeger, 1987.

His other writings include:

Monographs: The Politics of Regional Planning, the Greater Hartford Chamber of Commerce Town Meeting for Tomorrow, 1965; Bibliography of Social Scientific Studies of the Fluoridation Controversy, Journal of Oral Therapeutics and Pharmacology, November 1966; The Nature of Civil Protest, the Lemberg Center for the Study of Violence, Brandeis University, 1969; Public School Finance: Toward a More Level Playing Field for Our Youth, Phelps-Stokes Fund 1993.

A special US Senate study: The Effectiveness of Metropolitan Planning, with Charles Haar et al., prepared for the US Senate Subcommittee on Government Operations, 1964.

Books in the business field: Cutting Loose: From Employee to Entrepreneur: Making the Transition from Employee to Entrepreneur, 1985 and Using Consultants, 1986, both with Thomas A. Easton, Probus Publishing Company.

Unpublished MSS: The Politics of Metropolitan Consolidation in a Michigan Area, doctoral dissertation, University of Chicago, 1960; Metropolitan Problems and Politics: A Seminar, (edited papers), The University of Denver, 1962; An Evaluation of Fair Housing, Incorporated, Boston, Massachusetts, 1966; The Political Aspects of Health Planning in Berkshire County (MA): A Report to the Berkshire County Health Planning Association, 1969; The Professional, Business, and  Economic Service Needs of the Residents of the Suburban Library System, Chicago, 1973.

Articles on aspects of metropolitan and regional planning, and on protest and riots.

References

External links
Conant Associates
Conant Associates: Biography of Ralph W. Conant

American urban planners
University of Chicago alumni
Boston College faculty
Harvard University people
Presidents of Shimer College
1926 births
2017 deaths
Massachusetts Institute of Technology staff
Michigan State University faculty
New York University staff
University of Denver faculty
Brandeis University staff
University of Houston faculty
Unity College (Maine) faculty
University of Vermont alumni
People from Trinidad, California
Rice University faculty